Sierra is both a surname and a feminine given name. It is the Spanish word for saw or mountain range, and as such it connotes strength and groundedness. It originates from the Galicia and Asturias regions of northern Spain. 

Notable people with the name include:

Surname
 Álvaro Sierra (born 1967), Colombian road cyclist
 Arlene Sierra (born 1970), American classical composer
 Javier Sierra (born 1971), Spanish journalist
 Jessica Sierra (born 1985), American Idol 4 contestant
 José David Sierra (born 1980), Puerto Rican drag queen also known as Jessica Wild
 José Luis Sierra (born 1968), Chilean footballer
 Liza del Sierra (born 1985), French pornographic actress, film director, and producer. In use as stage name.
 Magneuris Sierra (born 1996), Dominican professional baseball player
 Nadine Sierra (born 1988), American operatic soprano
 Roberto Sierra (born 1953), Puerto Rican classical composer
 Rubén Sierra (born 1965), Puerto Rican professional baseball player
 Sola Sierra (1935–1999), Chilean human rights activist
 Andrew Sierra (born 1990), American musician, manager & entrepreneur.

Given name
 Sierra Boggess (born 1982), American theater actress
 Sierra Capri (born 1998), American actress
 Sierra Cartwright (born 1963), British novelist
 Sierra Casady (born c. 1980), American musician, band member of CocoRosie
 Sierra Fellers (born 1986), American professional skateboarder
 Sierra Hull (born 1991), American musician
 Sierra Hyland (born 1995), Mexican former softball pitcher
 Sierra Jackson (born 1992), American sprint car racer
 Sierra Katow, American stand-up comedian, actor, writer, and podcaster
 Sierra Kay (born 1990), American musician, band member of VersaEmerge
 Sierra McClain (born 1994), American actress and singer
 Sierra McCormick (born 1997), American actress
 Sierra Noble (born 1990), Canadian singer-songwriter and musician
 Sierra Romero (born 1994), Mexican-American former softball player
 Sierra Schmidt (born 1998), American competition swimmer
 Sierra St. James, one of the pen names of American writer Janette Rallison (born 1966)
 Sierra Swan (born 1978), American musician and daughter of Billy Swan
 Sierra Teller Ornelas (born 1981), Navajo and American showrunner, screenwriter, filmmaker, and weaver

Fictional characters
 Sierra Ripoche, from Patrick McGrath's novels

Feminine given names